Burned My Ass is an album released in 2004 by Annabelle Chvostek.

The initial track, "Devil's Paintbrush Road", was re-worked by The Wailin' Jennys for the album Firecracker.

Track listing
 "Devil's Paintbrush Road"
 "Moya Hlava"
 "Food on My Face"
 "A Ja Taka Dzivočka" (Slovak traditional)
 "The Fool"
 "Slaves"

Annabelle Chvostek albums
2004 albums